Mark Gerrard (born 4 September 1982) is a former Australian professional rugby union footballer. He currently is the assistant coach for the Austin Gilgronis in Major League Rugby (MLR) competition in the United States. In 2011,  he was one of 10 players nominated to become the competition's Super Rugby player of the year.

Gerrard has played for the Australian Wallabies and previously played for the NSW Waratahs and the ACT Brumbies. He usually plays at fullback or wing but can also cover in the centres and sometimes flyhalf. His sister Mo'onia Gerrard is an Australian representative netballer. He is the cousin of Wallaby Wycliff Palu.

Biography
Gerrard was educated at both Narrabeen North Primary School and Narrabeen Sports High School, where he started playing rugby league, representing Australian School Boys in that code before switching to Rugby Union. Gerrard made the Australian Schoolboys team in 1999.

Gerrard went on to play for the Warringah Rugby Club and represented Australia in the national under-19s side in both 2000 and 2001; also in 2001 he represented Australia in the under-21s side. After the successful appearances for junior representative sides, he made his Super 12 debut for the New South Wales Waratahs. He continued to make the under-21 Australian side up for the next two years, before touring Japan with Australia A in 2003. He signed for the ACT Brumbies for the 2003 season. He made his debut for the Brumbies against the Sharks at Durban, scoring a try. He played for the Brumbies in 2004, with the team winning the championship. He missed out on a mid-year test match against England in Brisbane due to injury. He was a member of the Australian squad that toured England, Scotland and France at the end of the year but did not play because of a recurring hamstring injury. In late 2005 he made his Test debut for Australia when he came on as a replacement against Italy in Melbourne.

Gerrard moved to Japan and spent one season with the NTT Communications Shining Arcs.

During the coronation of the present King of Tonga, Mark Gerrard played for Tonga during the coronation rugby match in the Teufaiva stadium.

Gerrard moved back from Japan to join the Melbourne Rebels for the start of the 2011 Super Rugby season. He played 11 of the Rebels 16 games that year. Later in 2011, Gerrard was named in the 40-man Wallabies squad.

In May 2012, Gerrard was expected to play his 100th Super Rugby game.

References

External links
 Stats on It's Rugby

1982 births
Australian rugby union players
Australia international rugby union players
ACT Brumbies players
Living people
Australian sportspeople of Tongan descent
Melbourne Rebels players
New South Wales Waratahs players
Australian expatriate rugby union players
Expatriate rugby union players in Japan
Australian expatriate sportspeople in Japan
Rugby union players from Sydney
Rugby union fullbacks
Rugby union wings
Urayasu D-Rocks players
Toyota Industries Shuttles Aichi players
Rugby union centres
Rugby union fly-halves